The doubles tennis tournament for the 1988 Taipei Women's Championship was a 16-team single-elimination tournament.

Cammy MacGregor and Cynthia MacGregor were the defending champions but did not compete that year.

Patty Fendick and Ann Henricksson won in the final 6–2, 2–6, 6–2 against Belinda Cordwell and Julie Richardson.

Seeds
Champion seeds are indicated in bold text while text in italics indicates the round in which those seeds were eliminated. All four seeded teams received byes into the quarterfinals.

 Patty Fendick /  Ann Henricksson (champions)
 Patricia Hy /  Catarina Lindqvist (quarterfinals)
 Stephanie Rehe /  Elizabeth Smylie (quarterfinals)
 Belinda Cordwell /  Julie Richardson (final)

Draw

References
 1988 Taiwan Open Doubles Draw

1988 Doubles
1988 WTA Tour
1988 in Taiwanese tennis